Women's 100m races for blind & visually impaired athletes at the 2004 Summer Paralympics were held in the Athens Olympic Stadium. Events were held in two disability classes.

T12

The T12 event consisted of 4 heats, 2 semifinals and A & B finals. It was won by Assia El Hannouni, representing .

1st Round

Heat 1
25 Sept. 2004, 22:00

Heat 2
25 Sept. 2004, 22:07

Heat 3
25 Sept. 2004, 22:14

Heat 4
25 Sept. 2004, 22:21

Semifinals
Heat 1
26 Sept. 2004, 19:10

Heat 2
26 Sept. 2004, 19:17

Final Round
Final A
27 Sept. 2004, 18:00

Final B
27 Sept. 2004, 17:55

T13

The T13 event consisted of a single race. It was won by Olga Semenova, representing .

Final Round
27 Sept. 2004, 18:20

References

W
2004 in women's athletics